In organometallic chemistry, acetylide refers to chemical compounds with the chemical formulas  and , where M is a metal. The term is used loosely and can refer to substituted acetylides having the general structure  (where R is an organic side chain).  Acetylides are reagents in organic synthesis.  The calcium acetylide commonly called calcium carbide is a major compound of commerce.

Structure and bonding

Alkali metal and alkaline earth metal acetylides of the general formula MC≡CM are salt-like Zintl phase compounds, containing  ions. Evidence for this ionic character can be seen in the ready hydrolysis of these compounds to form acetylene and metal oxides, there is also some evidence for the solubility of  ions in liquid ammonia. The  ion has a closed shell ground state of 1Σ, making it isoelectronic to a neutral molecule N2, which may afford it some stability.

Analogous acetylides prepared from other metals, particularly transition metals, show covalent character and are invariably associated with their metal centers. This can be seen in their general stability to water (such as silver acetylide, copper acetylide) and radically different chemical applications.

Acetylides of the general formula RC≡CM (where R = H or alkyl) generally show similar properties to their doubly substituted analogues. In the absence of additional ligands, metal acetylides adopt polymeric structures wherein the acetylide groups are bridging ligands.

Preparation
Terminal alkynes are weak acids:
 RC≡CH + R″M  R″H + RC≡CM

To generate acetylides from acetylene and alkynes relies on the use of  organometallic or inorganic superbases in solvents which are less acidic than the terminal alkyne.  In early studies liquid ammonia was employed, but ethereal solvents are more common.

Lithium amide, LiHMDS, or organolithium reagents, such as butyllithium, are frequently used to form lithium acetylides:

{H-C{\equiv}C-H} + \overset{butyllithium}{BuLi} ->[\ce{THF}][-78^\circ\ce C] {Li-\!{\equiv}\!-H} + BuH

Sodium or potassium acetylides can be prepared from various inorganic reagents (such as sodium amide) or from their elemental metals, often at room temperature and atmospheric pressure.

Copper(I) acetylide can be prepared by passing acetylene through an aqueous solution of copper(I) chloride because of a low solubility equilibrium. Similarly, silver acetylides can be obtained from silver nitrate.

Calcium carbide is prepared by heating carbon with lime (calcium oxide) at approximately 2,000 °C. A similar process is used to produce lithium carbide.

Reactions
Acetylides of the type RC2M are widely used in alkynylations in organic chemistry.  They are nucleophiles that add to a variety of electrophilic and unsaturated substrates. A classic application is the Favorskii reaction.

Illustrative is the sequence shown below, ethyl propiolate is deprotonated by n-butyllithium to give the corresponding acetylide.  This acetylide adds to the carbonyl center of cyclopentanone. Hydrolytic workup liberate the alkynyl alcohol.

Coupling reactions
Acetylides are sometimes intermediates in coupling reactions. Examples include Sonogashira coupling, Cadiot-Chodkiewicz coupling, Glaser coupling and Eglinton coupling.

Hazards
Some acetylides are notoriously explosive. Formation of acetylides poses a risk in handling of gaseous acetylene in presence of metals such as mercury, silver or copper, or alloys with their high content (brass, bronze, silver solder).

See also
 Ethynyl
 Ethynyl radical
 Diatomic carbon (neutral C2)
 Acetylenediol

References

Anions
Functional groups